The 1934 Millsaps Majors football team was an American football team that represented Millsaps College as a member of the Dixie Conference and the Southern Intercollegiate Athletic Association (SIAA) in the 1934 college football season. Led by Tranny Lee Gaddy in his third season as head coach, the team compiled an overall record of 7–1–2 and with a mark of 2–1–1 in Dixie Conference play and 4–0–2 against SIAA competition.

Schedule

References

Millsaps
Millsaps
Millsaps Majors football seasons
Millsaps Majors football